Dollar is an unincorporated community in Coosa County, Alabama, United States.

History
A post office called Dollar was established in 1883, and remained in operation until it was discontinued in 1921.

References

Unincorporated communities in Coosa County, Alabama
Unincorporated communities in Alabama